The Hamilton, Ontario, tornado of 2005 was a tornado that touched down during the late afternoon hours of Wednesday, November 9, 2005, in the city of Hamilton, Ontario.

Synoptic conditions
The first week of November that year had been unusually mild with the jet stream much further north than usual. On the morning of the November 9 2005, a major autumn storm system was passing through northern Ontario (where heavy amounts of snow fell) with much milder air working in across the lower Great Lakes. As the system began to occlude, southern Ontario was forecast to be in the triple point, a favourable area for the development of severe thunderstorms due to high helicity values. Numerical models (especially the ETA model) had been predicting values of this, in excess of 600–800m^2/s^2 for the risk area.

Along the warm front, some thunderstorms with rotation did develop towards the noon hour along the shores of Lake Erie but this convection was highly elevated and no tornadoes were reported. Later in the afternoon around 3:20pm, as the cold front approached from the west, a line of fast-moving thunderstorms developed rapidly in the Brantford area. Gusty winds and very heavy downpours were reported by 3:45pm as they began to move into the west end of Hamilton.

The tornado
By 4:00pm, as the thunderstorm was moving through the city of Hamilton, the tornado hit. Eyewitnesses reported seeing a funnel cloud overhead, laden with flying debris. While there were some hints of damage as far west as Ancaster, the area of worst damage was concentrated in the Mountain neighbourhoods south of Mohawk Road east of Limeridge Mall. Berko Avenue was particularly hard hit, including Lawfield School.

The school had the north part of its roof peeled off and the north wall had buckled underneath (this ultimately led to the school's demolition and relocation in following months). Large dumpsters in the school's parking lot were thrown around the property. .  Homes just across the street from Lawfield (on the north side of Berko Avenue) also sustained structural damage, with some of their roofs partially removed and trees snapped or uprooted (some of which were 2–3 feet in diameter). Just east of this area there was damage to homes along Reno Avenue and Mohawk Road, but the tornado started to weaken (and probably lifted) shortly after this. There was some damage to a warehouse near the QEW on Millen Avenue but this damage was minor by comparison.

On the following day, a storm survey team from Environment Canada toured the most heavily impacted portion of the track near Lawfield Elementary school and rated it as a strong F1 on the Fujita scale with winds of 118 to 180 km/h (73 to 112 mph) based on the aforementioned damage to trees and homes.

Climatological rarity
Southern Ontario usually receives about a dozen tornadoes each year, with most of them occurring between May and September. April and October tornadoes are much less common, and tornadoes rarely occur outside of those time frames. This November 9 tornado was the latest tornado in a year recorded in Ontario since an F2 tornado hit near Exeter on December 12, 1946. The only other tornado this late in the season occurred near Leamington on November 29, 1919.

References

Rennison, J. (2005, November 10). Blown Away. Hamilton Spectator, p. A7
https://web.archive.org/web/20060426202608/http://www.ctv.ca/servlet/ArticleNews/story/CTVNews/20051110/hamilton_tornado_claims_051110/20051110?hub=CTVNewsAt11
https://web.archive.org/web/20080512150515/http://www.ontariostorms.com/2005/index.html

Tornadoes in Ontario
2005 in Ontario
History of Hamilton, Ontario
November 2005 events in Canada
Tornadoes of 2005
2005 disasters in Canada
21st century in Hamilton, Ontario
2005-11-09